The Landing Craft Air Cushion (LCAC) is a class of air-cushioned landing craft (hovercraft) used by the United States Navy and the Japan Maritime Self-Defense Force (JMSDF). They transport weapons systems, equipment, cargo and personnel from ship to shore and across the beach. It is to be replaced in US service by the Ship-to-Shore Connector (SSC).

Design and development
Two prototypes were built; JEFF A by Aerojet General in California, JEFF B by Bell Aerospace

JEFF A had four rotating ducted propellers JEFF B had two ducted rear propellers similar to the proposed SK-10 which was derived from the previous Bell SK-5 / SR.N5 hovercraft tested in Vietnam. JEFF B was selected for the LCAC. JEFF A was later modified for Arctic use and deployed in Prudhoe Bay to support offshore oil drilling.

The first 33 were included in the FY82-86 defense budgets, 15 in FY89, 12 each in FY90, FY91 and FY92, while seven were included in FY93. The first LCAC was delivered to the Navy in 1984 and Initial Operational Capability (IOC) was achieved in 1986. Approval for full production was granted in 1987.

After an initial 15-craft competitive production contract was awarded to each of two companies, Textron Marine & Land Systems (TMLS) of New Orleans, La, and Avondale Gulfport Marine, TMLS was selected to build the remaining craft. The final craft was delivered in 2001.

On June 29, 1987, approval was granted for full LCAC production. Forty-eight air-cushion landing craft were authorized and appropriated through FY 89. Lockheed Shipbuilding Company was competitively selected as a second source. The FY 1990 budget request included $219.3 million for nine craft. The FY 1991 request included full funding for 12 LCACs and advance procurement in support of the FY 1992 program (which was intended to be nine craft). The remaining 24 were funded in FY92.

Operations
The LCAC first deployed in 1987 aboard . LCACs are transported in and operate from all the U.S. Navy's amphibious-well deck ships including LHA, LHD, LSD and LPD.

All of the planned 91 craft were delivered. Seventeen have since been disassembled or terminated for cost reasons, two are held for R&D, and 36 are in use on each coast at Little Creek, Virginia and Camp Pendleton, California. Eight minesweeping kits were acquired in 1994–1995. A service-life extension program (SLEP) to extend service life from 20 to 30 years for the remaining 72 active LCACs was begun in 2000 and was scheduled to be completed by 2018.

The craft operates with a crew of five. In addition to beach landing, LCAC provides personnel transport, evacuation support, lane breaching, mine countermeasure operations, and Marine and Special Warfare equipment delivery.  The four main engines are all used for lift and all used for main propulsion. The craft can continue to operate, at reduced capability, with two engines inoperable. They are interchangeable for redundancy. A transport model can seat 180 fully equipped troops. 

The LCAC is capable of carrying a 60 short-ton payload (up to 75 tons in an overload condition), including one M-1 Abrams tank, at speeds over 40 knots. Fuel capacity is 5000 gallons. The LCAC uses an average of 1000 gallons per hour.

Maneuvering considerations include requiring 500 yards or more to stop and 2000 yards or more turning radius. Noise and dust levels are high with this craft. If disabled the craft is difficult to tow. In recent years spray suppression has been added to the craft's skirt to reduce interference with driver's vision.

SLEP

In Fiscal Year 2000 the Navy started an LCAC Service Life Extension Program (SLEP) to add 10 years of design life to each craft. The SLEP will be applied to 72 LCACs, extending their service life from 20 to 30 years.

Phase I. Replacing electronics components with readily available commercial Off-The-Shelf (COTS) components. The new electronics suite will be more reliable and less costly to operate and maintain.

Phase II. Buoyancy box replacement at the Textron Marine and Land Systems facility in New Orleans, LA, to increase the LCACs resistance to corrosion. Phase II will also include the electronics upgrade of Phase I, until the entire active fleet is outfitted with the new configuration. The new buoyancy box will incorporate improvements to damage stability and trim control of the LCACs.

NAVSEA transitioned from the research and development effort to the SLEP in 1999. Concurrently NAVSEA also considered additional SLEP options, including an enhanced engine to provide improved operation in excessively hot environments and an advanced skirt that is more reliable and cost effective.

The Navy continued the LCAC Service Life Extension Program in Fiscal Year 2001. This program combines major structural improvements with Command, Control, Communications, Computer and Navigation upgrades and adds 10 years to the service life, extending it to 30 years. In FY 2001, it was funded at $19.9 million and extended the service life of 1 craft. The SLEP is planned for a total of 72 craft.

The near-term focus will be on the "C4N" [Command, Control, Communications, Computers, and Navigation] program, to replace the crafts' obsolete equipment. This will focus on replacement of LN-66 radars with modern, high-power P-80 radar systems. Additionally, the SLEP will include an open-architecture concept, relying on modern commercial-off-the-shelf (COTS) equipment, which will allow much easier incorporation of later technology changes, such as the precision navigation system and communications systems ¾ fully interoperable with in-service and near-term future Joint systems ¾ now planned. The C4N program is to complete by 2010.

Through 2016, the Navy will look to incorporate other important service-life enhancements: Engine upgrades (ETF-40B configuration) that will provide additional power and lift particularly in hot (and higher) environments, reduced fuel consumption, reduced maintenance needs, and reduced lift footprint; Replacement of the buoyancy box to solve corrosion problems, incorporate hull improvements, and "reset" the fatigue-limit "clock"; Incorporation of a new (deep) skirt that will reduce drag, increase performance envelope over water and land, and reduce maintenance requirements.

As of September 2012, there were 80 LCACs in the U.S. Navy inventory; 39 LCACs had undergone the SLEP conversion and 7 were in progress and 4 are awaiting induction. The FY 2013 budget authorized 4 SLEP conversions per year through FY 2018. The last of the 72 SLEP conversions will be delivered to the Navy in FY 2020. After the first SLEP LCAC reached its 30 years design service age in 2015, it was to gradually be retired. In 2019, at which point the inventory of LCACs had fallen to 50, the USN began receiving the new Ship-to-Shore Connector (SSC), the LCAC-100.

The USN inventory of LCACs was projected to fall until 2023 after which SSC replacements would increase it.

Japanese operations

Six LCAC are in use by the Japan Maritime Self-Defense Force. Approval for the sale was given by the United States Government on 8 April 1994. The craft were built by Textron Marine & Land Systems in New Orleans, Louisiana. Purchase of the first craft was included in the FY93 budget, second in FY95, third and fourth in FY99 and fifth and sixth in FY00.

Operators

 Japan Maritime Self-Defense Force (6 units)

 United States Navy (74 units).
Assault Craft Unit 4
Assault Craft Unit 5
Naval Beach Unit 7 (Sasebo, Japan)

See also
 Air-cushioned landing craft
 Engin de débarquement amphibie rapide
 Lebed-class LCAC
 Type 726 LCAC
 Solgae-class LCAC
 Tsaplya-class LCAC – Three in service with ROKN
 Zubr-class LCAC

References

General
 Saunders, Stephen (RN). Jane's Fighting Ships, 2003–2004. .

External links

 LCAC U.S. Navy Fact File
 Textron Marine & Land Systems LCAC page
 LCAC specifications on GlobalSecurity.org
 LCAC page on Fas.org

 

Landing craft of the United States Navy
Military hovercraft
Textron